Lihir Island Airport is an airport in Londolovit on Lihir Island in Papua New Guinea. The airport has a short unpaved runway long enough to handle a small jet. All flights leave at approximately 4-7am.

The airport has significantly upgraded its facilities, which now includes air conditioning, x-ray machines and a renovated waiting area. It is assumed that this is because of the introduction of a new international flight to Cairns, Australia, operated by Airlines PNG.

Airlines and destinations

References

Airports in Papua New Guinea
New Ireland Province